is a Japanese economist and central banker.  He was the 29th Governor of the Bank of Japan (BOJ) and a Director of the Bank for International Settlements (BIS).

Early life
Fukui was born in Osaka.

Career
Fukui has worked at Japan's central bank for 40 years. His positions included serving as the bank's representative in Paris, heading the research and credit management bureaus, and Executive Director. He was head of the Banking Department from September 1986 through May 1989.

In 1989, Fukui was promoted to Deputy Governor of BOJ.

In 1998, Deputy Governor Fukui resigned in connection with a bribery scandal involving leaks of financially sensitive information.  He joined then-Governor Yasuo Matsushita in expressing official remorse by leaving the bank.  He then became chairman of the Fujitsu Research Institute, a private policy group.  He also became deputy chairman of the Japan Association of Corporate Executives.

Fukui was Deputy Governor of BOJ from 2002 through 2003; and he became the new BOJ governor at the end of the five-year term of Masaru Hayami.

Fukui served as Governor of the Bank of Japan from March 20, 2003 to March 19, 2008.  He resigned in 2008.

Selected works
In a statistical overview derived from writings by and about Toshihiko Fukui, OCLC/WorldCat encompasses roughly 1 works in 2 publications in 1 language and 6 library holdings.

 Recent developments of the short-term money market in Japan and changes in monetary control techiques [sic] and procedures by the Bank of Japan (1986)
 地球温暖化対策中期目標の解說 (2009)

Notes

References
 Ishii, Masayuki and Richard Werner (2003). . Tokyo: Appuru Shuppan.	;  OCLC 54655059
 Werner, Richard A. (2003). Princes of the Yen: Japan's Central Bankers and the Transformation of the Economy. Armonk, New York: M.E. Sharpe. ;  OCLC 471605161

1935 births
Living people
Governors of the Bank of Japan
Japanese economists
People from Osaka